Zabar Kuh (also Romanized as Zabar Kūh; also known as Zir Kooh and Zīr Kūh) is a village in Kuh Yakhab Rural District, Dastgerdan District, Tabas County, South Khorasan Province, Iran. At the 2006 census, its population was 67, in 21 families.

References 

Populated places in Tabas County